"Magic Touch" is a single by musician Mike Oldfield, released in 1988 (see 1988 in music).  It is from the album Islands.

Charts 
The song charted at number 10 on the US Billboard Hot Mainstream Rock Tracks Chart.

Release details 
It was only released in the USA, Germany and Australia.  The music video for this single was directed by Alex Proyas and filmed at Mentmore Towers in Buckinghamshire. The video for the song was available on The Wind Chimes and Elements.

Vocalists 
The original mix features Max Bacon on lead vocals and John Payne on backing vocals. The version with Max Bacon does not appear on the European releases of the Islands album, due to Bacon still being under contract to Arista Records at the time. However, Bacon's vocals do appear on the US album version, which was not released until 1988 in an attempt to capitalize on Bacon's familiarity to US audiences as the vocalist of GTR. The UK album version features Jim Price on vocals.

Artwork 
The single's artwork differed in the UK and US. The UK artwork showed Oldfield standing  in front of a blue background, on which shadows of hands are present. The US artwork is in a similar style to the album cover, showing hands rising out of the ocean.

Track listing 
 "Magic Touch" (Original mix edit) – 4:04
 "Music for the Video Wall" – 4:34
 "Magic Touch" (Original mix) – 4:13

References 

1988 singles
Mike Oldfield songs
Songs written by Mike Oldfield
Virgin Records singles
1987 songs